Cerci may refer to:

Surname
Alessio Cerci (born 1987), Italian footballer
Ferhat Cerci (born 1981), German footballer of Turkish descent
Selina Cerci (born 2000), German footballer with 1. FFC Turbine Potsdam

Places
Çerçi, Bayburt, a village in Bayburt Province, Turkey
Çerçi, Şabanözü

Biology
Cercis, a genus of the pea family Fabaceae
Cercus (singular form of cerci), an arthropod appendage

See also
 Circe (disambiguation)

Italian-language surnames
Turkish-language surnames